Grant le Roux (born 13 January 1986) is a South African rugby union player, who most recently played with the . His regular position is lock.

Career

He established himself as a regular as Boland, making 44 appearances before moving to the  before the 2012 Vodacom Cup season.

References

1986 births
Living people
People from Sasolburg
South African rugby union players
Boland Cavaliers players
SWD Eagles players
Rugby union locks
Rugby union players from the Free State (province)